Damir Rašić (born 5 October 1988 in Split) is a Croatian football player who plays for HNK Zmaj Makarska.

References

External links
 

1988 births
Living people
Footballers from Split, Croatia
Twin sportspeople
Association football defenders
Croatian footballers
HNK Hajduk Split players
NK Mosor players
NK Imotski players
NK Solin players
RNK Split players
NK Dugopolje players
NK Krka players
HNK Zmaj Makarska players
NK Vitez players
Croatian Football League players
First Football League (Croatia) players
Slovenian PrvaLiga players
Premier League of Bosnia and Herzegovina players
Croatian expatriate footballers
Expatriate footballers in Slovenia
Croatian expatriate sportspeople in Slovenia
Expatriate footballers in Bosnia and Herzegovina
Croatian expatriate sportspeople in Bosnia and Herzegovina